The City of Greater Geraldton in the Mid West region of Western Australia was originally established as a Municipality with a mayor and councillors under the Municipal Institutions Act in 1871. With the passage of the Local Government Act 1960, all municipalities became Towns effective 1 July 1961. On 22 April 1988, Geraldton was declared a City. In July 2007, it merged with the surrounding Shire of Greenough to form the City of Geraldton-Greenough.

In July 2011, the City merged with the Shire of Mullewa to form the City of Greater Geraldton.

Municipality of Geraldton

Town of Geraldton

City of Geraldton

City of Geraldton-Greenough

City of Greater Geraldton

References

Lists of local government leaders in Western Australia